Edward Healey was a British architect who worked mainly in Siam/Thailand during the first half of the twentieth century. He graduated from the Royal College of Arts in London in 1907, and travelled to Siam, becoming headmaster of the Poh Chang School of Arts and Crafts from 1910 to 1912. He ran a private construction firm, known as Siam Architect, and designed numerous buildings, including Devavesm Palace, the Headquarters Building of Chulalongkorn University, Manangkhasila Mansion, and the main building of the Siam Society.

References

20th-century British architects
Expatriate architects in the Rattanakosin Kingdom
British expatriates in Thailand
Edward Healey
19th-century births
20th-century deaths
Year of birth missing
Year of death missing